Caleb Muntz (born 30 October 1999) is a Fijian rugby union player, currently playing for the . His preferred position is fly-half or fullback.

Professional career
Muntz was named in the Fijian Drua squad for the 2022 Super Rugby Pacific season. He had previously represented the Drua in the 2019 National Rugby Championship.

References

External links
itsrugby.co.uk Profile

1999 births
Living people
Rugby union players from Huntly, New Zealand
People educated at Hamilton Boys' High School
Fijian rugby union players
Rugby union fly-halves
Rugby union fullbacks
Fijian Drua players